Maria Micşa (later Mosneagu, born 31 March 1953) is a retired Romanian rower who mostly competed in the quadruple sculls. In this event she won the European title in 1972 and an Olympic bronze medal in 1976, placing fourth in 1980; she also won silver medals at the 1977 world and 1973 European championships.

References

External links 
 
 
 
 
 

1953 births
Living people
Romanian female rowers
Olympic rowers of Romania
Rowers at the 1976 Summer Olympics
Rowers at the 1980 Summer Olympics
Olympic bronze medalists for Romania
Olympic medalists in rowing
Medalists at the 1976 Summer Olympics
World Rowing Championships medalists for Romania
European Rowing Championships medalists
Sportspeople from Timișoara